Magnus IV may refer to:

 Magnus IV of Norway (ca. 1115–1139)
 Magnus IV of Orkney (ruled 1273–1284)
 Magnus IV of Sweden (1316–1374)